Pleurofusia phasma is an extinct species of sea snail, a marine gastropod mollusk in the family Drilliidae.

Distribution
This extinct marine species was found in Miocene strata of Myanmar, age range 23.03 to 20.43 Ma

References

 E. Vredenburg. 1921. Comparative diagnoses of Pleurotomidae from the Tertiary formations of Burma. Records of the Geological Survey of India 53:83–129

External links

phasma
Gastropods described in 1921